The 2015–16 Louisiana–Lafayette Ragin' Cajuns women's basketball team represented the University of Louisiana at Lafayette during the 2015–16 NCAA Division I women's basketball season. The Ragin' Cajuns were led by fourth-year head coach Garry Brodhead and played all their home games at the Cajundome with a select few (mainly during the WBI) at Earl K. Long Gymnasium, which is located on the University of Louisiana at Lafayette campus. They were members in the Sun Belt Conference. They finished the season 25-10, 13–7 in Sun Belt play to finish in third place. They advanced to the semifinal game of the Sun Belt women's tournament where they lost to Little Rock by the score of 52-63. They competed in the Women's Basketball Invitational and went to the championship game, winning by the score of 87-85 in two overtimes against the Weber State Wildcats

Previous season 
The Ragin' Cajuns finished the 2014–15 season 23-12, 10–10 in Sun Belt play to finish sixth in the conference. They made it to the 2015 Sun Belt Conference Women's Basketball semifinal game after defeating Troy in the first round game before losing to Arkansas State Red Wolves in the semifinals. They would continue on to be invited to the Women's Basketball Invitational for the first time in school history, and would eventually be crowned National Champions in the WBI after defeating UT Pan American, McNeese State, Oral Roberts, and Siena in the First Round, Second Round, Semifinals, and Championship Game, respectively.

Roster

Schedule and results

|-
!colspan=9 style=| Exhibition

|-
!colspan=9 style=| Non-conference regular season

|-
!colspan=9 style=| Sun Belt regular season

|-
!colspan=9 style=| Non-conference regular season

|-
!colspan=9 style=| Sun Belt regular season

|-
!colspan=9 style=| Sun Belt Women's Tournament

|-
!colspan=9 style=| Women's Basketball Invitational

See also
 2015–16 Louisiana–Lafayette Ragin' Cajuns men's basketball team

References

Louisiana Ragin' Cajuns women's basketball seasons
Louisiana-Lafayette
Louisiana-Lafayette
Women's Basketball Invitational championship seasons
Louisiana
Louisiana